The 2015 Women's Southeast Asian Games Rugby sevens Tournament will be held in Choa Chu Kang Stadium, Singapore from 6 to 7 June 2015.

Results

Preliminary round

Third place match

Final

Final standing

External links
Rugby Sevens Schedule and Results

Women
Women's sports competitions in Singapore
2015 in women's rugby union
2015